Simple Things is the debut studio album by Zero 7, released on 23 April 2001. It peaked at number 28 on the UK Albums Chart, staying on the chart for 56 weeks. It was nominated for the Mercury Prize.

Critical reception

Tim DiGravina of AllMusic gave the album 4 stars out of 5, calling it "an accomplished slice of soulful genius that rewards frequent spins." He said, "the duo of Henry Binns and Sam Hardaker mix a number of musical elements, such as soul-influenced diva vocals, gurgling and ringing keyboards, and classical string arrangements, into a relaxing, potent wave of sounds." Matt Diehl of Rolling Stone gave the album 3.5 stars out of 5, saying, "More like jazz on acid than acid jazz, Simple Things can be hallucinatory yet eminently listenable; it's chill-out music with a little something for your mind as well." For Rob Mitchum, writing for Pitchfork, the album was too similar to Air's Moon Safari.

Track listing
Source:

In popular culture
 "In the Waiting Line" appeared in the season 6 episode, "The Domino Effect" on Sex and the City, in the season 3 episode of House (Needle in a Haystack), and in the 2004 film Garden State.
 "Destiny" appeared in the 2002 film Blue Crush, and well the 2009 film Obsessed.
 “Give It Away” was used as a background track on the CBBC show SMart when sharing viewers artwork that had been sent in, the previous week.

Personnel
Credits adapted from liner notes.
 Zero 7 – production, mixing
 Demus – mixing (3, 5)
 Mozez – vocals (1, 5, 10)
 Sia Furler – vocals (3, 7)
 Sophie Barker – vocals (3, 8, 14)
 Philani Mothers - vocals (11)
 Dedi Madden – guitar (1, 7, 8)
 Allan Simpson – guitar (3, 4, 6)
 Phil Thornalley – guitar (9), bass guitar (9)
 Pete Trotman – bass guitar (1, 2, 3, 4, 6, 7, 8, 12)
 Max Beesley – Rhodes piano (5)
 The Brilliant Strings – strings (1, 4, 5, 6, 12)
 Sally Herbert – violin (1, 7, 10, 11)
 Graeme Stewart – trumpet (4, 6)
 Simon Elms – trumpet (9)
 Dan Litman – flute (6)
 Jeremy Stacey – drums (1, 8, 12)
 Miggi Barradas – drums (4)
 Ollie Savill – percussion (2)
 Jenny Arrel – percussion (11)
 House – design

Charts

Weekly charts

Year-end charts

Certifications and sales

References

External links
 
 

2001 debut albums
Zero 7 albums